Muhammad Shakir bin Hamzah (born 20 October 1992) is a Singaporean professional footballer who plays as a defender for Singapore Premier League club Tanjong Pagar United and the Singapore national team.

Club career

Young Lions 
Shakir began his career with Young Lions in the S.League in 2009 after graduating from the National Football Academy.

LionsXII 
In December 2011, Shakir was named in the newly formed LionsXII squad for the 2012 Malaysia Super League. He played on the left side of defence as the Lions won the Super League in 2013.

In June 2013, Shakir served four days of detention for going absent without leave from his National Service. He had travelled away with the LionsXII squad for a Super League match with Pahang on 17 May without obtaining official approval. He was suspended from all football activities by the Football Association of Singapore pending an investigation and was later fined S$4,000 and ordered to serve 30 hours of community service in football-related activities.

Tampines Rovers 
Following the disbandment of the LionsXII, Shakir signed for S.League powerhouse Tampines Rovers on a two-year contract.

Home United 
Shakir was released by Tampines following the conclusion of the 2017 S.League season due to disciplinary issues. He was subsequently signed by Home United for the 2018 Singapore Premier League season.

Kedah Darul Aman
Shakir signed for the MSL club, Kedah Darul Aman for the 2019 season. His first season for the Malaysian side was a success; playing as a centre back, he scored 4 goals for the club and was the only Kedah Darul Aman player to be named in the 2019 MSL Team of the Season while also helping his side to the 2019 Malaysia FA Cup Final. Shakir won the 2019 Malaysia FA Cup in his first season with the club.

Perak FC 
In December 2020, Shakir had joined Perak FC a year after joining Kedah Darul Aman.

In May 2021, Shakir left Perak after mutually consenting to termination of his contract due to Perak's financial problems.

Tanjong Pagar United 
On 16 July 2021, Shakir officially signed for Tanjong Pagar United and return to Singapore Premier League. Shakir make his first appearance for Tanjong Pagar against Geylang International FC when Delwinder Singh was injured before the match and replaced him. His debut appearance saw him scoring an own goal in a 3-1 defeat.

International career

Shakir was part of the 2013 Southeast Asian Games squad which won a bronze medal. He made his senior team debut starting in the first leg of the Causeway Challenge against Malaysia on 8 June 2012. He scored his first international goal in a 1–1 draw against Turkmenistan in a 2019 AFC Asian Cup qualification match. He followed up with his second international goal in a 3–2 friendly win over Maldives at the Singapore Sports Hub. It was also his second consecutive international goal.

In June 2021, Shakir pulled out of the Singapore team before Singapore's World Cup qualifying match against Saudi Arabia. Shakir responded that he had to return to Malaysia to handle legal matters moving his family from Malaysia to Singapore.

Shakir was called up to the national team for the 2020 AFF Championship held in Singapore in 2021. Shakir scored the second goal against Timor-Leste in a 2-0 win during the group stage of the tournament. During the final group match against Thailand, Shakir collided with Thitiphan Puangchan in the 11th minute. Shakir was stretchered out and was substituted for the match. He suffered various injuries and was ruled out for the rest of the tournament.

Others

Singapore Selection Squad
Shakir was part of the Singapore Selection squad for The Sultan of Selangor's Cup held on 6 May 2017.

Personal life

Shakir is the son of former Singapore left-back Hamzah Haron. His older brother is ex-LionsXII teammate Shahir Hamzah.

Career statistics

Club

. Caps and goals may not be correct.

 Young Lions and LionsXII are ineligible for qualification to AFC competitions in their respective leagues.
 Young Lions withdrew from the Singapore Cup and Singapore League Cup in 2011 due to scheduled participation in the 2011 AFF U-23 Youth Championship.

International statistics

Statistics accurate as of match played 5 March 2014

International caps

International goals
Scores and results list Singapore's goal tally first.

U23 International goals

U19 International caps

Honours

Club
LionsXII
Malaysia Super League: 2013
 Malaysia FA Cup: 2015

Kedah
 Malaysia FA Cup: 2019

References

External links
 

1992 births
Living people
Singaporean footballers
Singapore international footballers
Association football fullbacks
LionsXII players
Singapore Premier League players
Singaporean people of Malay descent
Malaysia Super League players
Young Lions FC players
Footballers at the 2010 Asian Games
Footballers at the 2014 Asian Games
Asian Games competitors for Singapore